England and Wales have played each other at rugby union since 1881. A total of 139 matches have been played, with England having won 67 times, Wales having won 60 times and 12 matches having been drawn. There is a considerable rivalry between the sides due to the proximity of the two nations and the history between them.

Apart from their annual match, currently part of the Six Nations Championship, the teams have also met in six warm-up matches prior to the 2003, 2007, 2011 and 2019 World Cups, with England winning on four occasions and Wales two and a one-off match in May 2016, as a warm-up match prior to each country's summer tour to the Southern Hemisphere.

Summary

Overall

Records 
Note: Date shown in brackets indicates when the record was last set.

Results

Venues

In England

Note: The match at Wembley Stadium was considered a home match for Wales, who played home fixtures there from 1997-1999 while the Millennium Stadium was under construction.

In Wales

In other countries

References

 
England national rugby union team matches
Wales national rugby union team matches
Six Nations Championship
Rugby union rivalries in Wales
Rugby union rivalries in England